Njoo Kiem Bie (naturalized name Koesbianto) (17 September 1927 – 7 January 2008) was a male badminton player from Indonesia in the 1950s. His biggest achievement was helping to bring the Thomas Cup (world men's team title) to Indonesia for the first time, as a doubles player in the 1958 series in Singapore, and helping to defend that title in 1961 in Jakarta.

Private life
His wife's name was Sisca Ling. He had two children, Lucy and Maria.

Clubs
 POR Tionghoa, PB Happy, PB Rajawali, PB Suryanaga

Achievements

As a player
 Winning men's singles, men's doubles, mixed doubles All Surabaya and East Java Badminton Championship between 1942 and 1956
 Member of world champion Thomas Cup team 1958 at Singapore
 Member of world champion Thomas Cup team 1961 at Jakarta
 Winning Indonesia National Championships in men's doubles (1960, 1964) and mixed doubles (1955)

As a staff member
 Expert Council PBSI East Java
 PB PBSI's Generally Opinion and Expert Council

Honours
 Anugerah Satya Lencana Kebudayaan from President Sukarno
 Tanda kehormatan Menteri Pertahanan Keamanan L.B. Moerdani
 Satya Lencana Kelas 1 PB PBSI
 Tanda Kehormatan Gubernur Akabri Laut Soeprapto
 Tanda Kehormatan Presiden IBF Ron Palmer
 Tanda kehormatan East Java Gouvernour Mohammad Noer and Ketua DPRD Jawa Timur M. Said

References
 Indopos: Kaget Dapat Rumah dari Bung Karno 
 Indopos: Stres kalau Banyak Nganggur 
 Indopos: Tan Joe Hok, Tenar setelah Mengalahkan Kiem Bie 
Cited

External links
  Kompas: Om Njoo Gembira obituary
 Jawa Pos: Om Njoo Gembira obituary
  Brown, Collin: Sport,Politics and Ethnicity: Playing Badminton for Indonesia

1927 births
2008 deaths
Indonesian male badminton players
Indonesian people of Chinese descent
Indonesian Hokkien people
Sportspeople from Surabaya
20th-century Indonesian people